This is a list of films whose setting is Madrid, Spain.

1940s 

 The Tower of the Seven Hunchbacks (Edgar Neville, 1944)
 The Crime of Bordadores Street (Edgar Neville, 1946)

1950s 

 Death of a Cyclist (Juan Antonio Bardem, 1955)
 Uncle Hyacynth (Ladislao Vajda, 1956)
 El Pisito (Marco Ferreri, 1959)

1960s 

 The Delinquents (Carlos Saura, 1960)
Atraco a las tres (José María Forqué, 1962)
 The Executioner (Luis García Berlanga, 1963)

1970s 

La cabina (Antonio Mercero, 1972)
La escopeta nacional (Luis García Berlanga, 1978)
 Ogro (Gillo Pontecorvo, 1979)

1980s 

Pepi, Luci, Bom (Pedro Almodóvar, 1980)
Bicycles Are for the Summer (Jaime Chávarri, 1984)
What Have I Done to Deserve This? (Pedro Almodóvar, 1984)
Law of Desire (Pedro Almodóvar, 1987)

1990s 

High Heels (Pedro Almodóvar, 1991)
The Day of the Beast (Álex de la Iglesia, 1995)
Tesis (Alejandro Amenábar, 1996)
Open Your Eyes (Alejandro Amenábar, 1997)
Lovers of the Arctic Circle (Julio Medem, 1998)

2000s 

El Bola (Achero Mañas, 2000)
La comunidad (Álex de la Iglesia, 2000)
Dark Blue Almost Black (Daniel Sánchez Arévalo, 2006)
The Bourne Ultimatum (Paul Greengrass, 2007)

2010s 

I'm So Excited (Pedro Almodóvar, 2013)
May God Save Us (Rodrigo Sorogoyen, 2016)
Perfect Strangers (Álex de la Iglesia, 2017)
Pain and Glory (Pedro Almodóvar, 2019)

See also 
 List of Spanish films
 Cinema of Spain
 European cinema

Madrid
Spain in fiction

Films
Madrid